Baba Rostam (also Romanized as Bābā Rostam; also known as Bārā Rostam and Būwār Hasan) is a village in Khvor Khvoreh Rural District, in the Central District of Bijar County, Kurdistan Province, Iran. At the 2006 census, its population was 98, in 24 families. The village is populated by Kurds.

References 

Towns and villages in Bijar County
Kurdish settlements in Kurdistan Province